Alborough is an English surname. Notable people with the surname include:

Jez Alborough (born 1959), English writer and illustrator
Paul Alborough (born 1975), English musician
Roger Alborough (born 1953), English actor

English-language surnames